Chauncey Bradley Ives  (December 14, 1810 – 1894) was an American sculptor who worked primarily in the Neo-classic style.  His best known works are the marble statues of Jonathan Trumbull and Roger Sherman (Roger Sherman) enshrined in the National Statuary Hall Collection.

Early years

Ives was born in Hamden, Connecticut and at the age of 16 was apprenticed to Rodolphus Northrop, a woodcarver in nearby New Haven.  He may also have studied with Hezekiah Augur, another local woodcarver who was a pioneer American marble carver.

Shortly thereafter Ives turned to marble carving and began carving portraits, first in Boston, Massachusetts and then in New York City.

Poor health (and, according to Craven, p. 235,  perhaps too much competition from other sculptors in Boston and New York) eventually convinced Ives to move to Europe in 1844, where he ultimately settled in the expatriate artist community there.  He was to remain in Italy, after moving to Rome in 1851 for the rest of his life.  His final resting place is in the Protestant Cemetery, Rome in Rome.

Ives' statue of Undine Rising from the Waters (1884)  remains one of the icons of the American neo-classical movement, being selected to grace the front covers of at least three books about sculpture, American Sculpture at Yale University, Marble Queens and Captives and A Marble Quarry, where the back of the statue also serves as the book's back cover.  Ives was to revisit the subject of Undine in another work,  Undine Rising from the Fountain.

Ives' reputation did not survive much longer than his life. Art historian and sculptor Lorado Taft includes him in Taft's seminal book The History of American Sculpture in a chapter entitled Some Minor Sculptors of the Early Years, and says of his Trumbull and Sherman statues at the Connecticut State Capitol, "Descriptions of these curious works would be unprofitable.  They fit in nicely with the majority of their companions, but of all the dead man there they seem the most conscious of being dead." 

Unlike most of his other works The Willing Captive (c. 1862–68), while still designed to appeal to the 19th Century desire for sentimentality in art, contained more content than is typically found in art of that era.  The work, subtitled An Historical Incident of November, 1764,  depicts a real event that occurred during the French and Indian War in which a young woman is torn between the Natives that she has been living with after being captured by them and a white woman, her mother,  who has come to take her back.  An 1886 bronze cast of the work now resides in Lincoln Park in Newark, New Jersey.

Portraits

Ives created many portraits of the well known and not so well known persons of his time, many created in Rome of wealthy Americans who were traveling in Europe.  Some of these portrait statues and busts include ones of:

Thomas Church Brownell (1869), Hartford, Connecticut
Roger Sherman, (1870), National Statuary Hall Collection, United States Capitol, Washington D. C.
Noah Webster, (1840)
William H. Seward, (1857)
Edward Hitchcock
Roger Sherman, (1878)
Jonathan Trumbull, (1878)
Jeremiah Day
Thomas Day, (1842)
Rev. Dr. Nathaniel William Taylor, (1860)
Ithiel Town
Frances Pierce & her infant daughter. (1864) Rosehill Cemetery, United States, Chicago

Mythical and allegorical subjects

Like many other Victorian era artists Ives studio in Rome generated a large number of works drawn from Greek and other mythologies.  Works in this oeuvre include his statues of:
Pandora
Ariadne
Ceres
Undine
Jephthah's Daughter
Rebecca at the Well
Nursing the Infant Bacchus
Flora
Egeria
The Hebrew Captive
Ruth

Collections

Works by Ives can be found in numerous collections, including:

Buffalo History Museum, Buffalo, New York
Amherst College, Mead Art Museum, Amherst, Massachusetts
Lyman Allyn Museum, New London, Connecticut
Connecticut State Capitol, Hartford, Connecticut
Yale University Art Gallery, New Haven, Connecticut
Corcoran Gallery of Art, Washington D.C.
Smithsonian Museum of American Art, Washington D.C.
New York Historical Society, New York City
Museum of Fine Arts, Boston, Massachusetts
Maryland Historical Society, Baltimore, Maryland
Cincinnati Historical Society, Cincinnati, Ohio
Cincinnati Museum of Art, Cincinnati, Ohio
University of Tennessee, Ackien Mansion, Nashville, Tennessee
State Historical Society of Wisconsin, Madison, Wisconsin
Peabody Essex Museum, Salem, Massachusetts
Metropolitan Museum of Art, New York City
Virginia Museum of Fine Arts, Richmond, Virginia
Chrysler Museum, Norfolk, Virginia
Art Institute of Chicago, Chicago, Illinois
Detroit Institute of Arts, Detroit, Michigan
High Museum of Art, Atlanta, Georgia

References

Sources
Compilation of Works of Art and Other Objects in the United States Capitol,  Prepared by the Architect of the Capitol under the Joint Committee on the Library, United States Government Printing House, Washington,  1965
Craven, Wayne, Sculpture in America, Thomas Y. Crowell Co, NY, NY  1968
Greenthal, Kozol, Rameirez & Fairbanks, American Figurative Sculpture in the Museum of Fine Arts, Boston, Museum of Fine Arts, Boston  1986
Murdock, Myrtle Cheney, National Statuary Hall in the Nation's Capitol, Monumental Press, Inc., Washington D.C., 1955
Opitz, Glenn B, Editor, Mantle Fielding’s Dictionary of American Painters, Sculptors & Engravers,  Apollo Book, Poughkeepsie NY, 1986
Taft, Lorado, The History of American Sculpture, MacMillan Co., New York,  NY  1925
Thurkow, Fearn, Newark's Sculpture: A Survey of Public Monuments and Memorial Statuary,  The Newark Museum Quarterly, Newark Museum Association, Winter 1975

External links

Art and the empire city: New York, 1825-1861, an exhibition catalog from The Metropolitan Museum of Art (fully available online as PDF), which contains material on Ives (see index)

1810 births
1894 deaths
19th-century American sculptors
American male sculptors
People from Hamden, Connecticut
Burials in the Protestant Cemetery, Rome
Sculptors from Connecticut
19th-century American male artists